The Blackwell Baronetcy, of Sprowston in the County of Norfolk, was a title in the Baronetage of Great Britain.

The baronetcy was created on 16 July 1718 for Sir Lambert Blackwell, Kt of Sprowston Hall near Norwich, Norfolk.  Descended from the Blackwells of Surrey, he was a younger son of John Blackwell of Mortlake. He was Knight Harbinger and Gentleman of the Privy Chamber to William III by whom he was knighted in 1697. He was a director of the South Sea Company and Member of Parliament for Wilton 1708-10. The baronetcy became extinct on the death of his grandson, the third Baronet, in 1801.

Blackwell baronets, of Sprowston (1718)
 Sir Lambert Blackwell, 1st Baronet (died 1727)
 Sir Charles Blackwell, 2nd Baronet (1700–1741)
 Sir Lambert Blackwell, 3rd Baronet (1732–1801)

References

 A Genealogical and Heraldic History of the Extinct and Dormant Baronetcies of England, Ireland, and Scotland. John Burke (1832) p64. Google Books

Extinct baronetcies in the Baronetage of Great Britain